The Dunedin North by-election of 1922 was a by-election held during the 20th New Zealand Parliament in the Dunedin electorate of Dunedin North. This election for the New Zealand Labour Party was significant as, excluding in 1925, Jim Munro would retain the seat until his death in 1945.

Cause of by-election
The by-election was caused by the death of Edward Kellett, the previous Member of Parliament for Dunedin North. Kellett had held Dunedin North since the General election, of 1919. The by-election was won by Labour's Jim Munro.

Results
The following table gives the election results:

See also

List of New Zealand by-elections
1945 Dunedin North by-election
1953 North Dunedin by-election

Notes

References

1922 elections in New Zealand
By-elections in New Zealand
1920s in Dunedin
Politics of Dunedin